Diplophos taenia is a species of fish in the family Gonostomatidae.

References 

Gonostomatidae
Animals described in 1873